Prairie View is a city in Waller County, Texas, United States, situated on the northwestern edge of the  metropolitan area. The population was 8,184 at the 2020 census.

Prairie View A&M University, the second oldest public university in Texas, is based in the city.

Geography

Prairie View is located at  (30.082131, –95.991788).

According to the United States Census Bureau, the city has a total area of 7.2 square miles (18.7 km), all of it land.  The city is bisected by US 290 and is neighbored by Hempstead, Texas to the west, Waller, Texas to the east, and Pine Island, Texas to the south.

Demographics

As of the 2020 United States census, there were 8,184 people, 1,031 households, and 353 families residing in the city.

As of the census of 2000, there were 4,410 people, 694 households, and 360 families residing in the city. The population density was 611.0 people per square mile (235.8/km). There were 834 housing units at an average density of 115.6 per square mile (44.6/km). The racial makeup of the city was 3.47% White, 93.51% African American, 0.18% Native American, 0.43% Asian, 1.36% from other races, and 1.04% from two or more races. Hispanic or Latino of any race were 2.65% of the population.

There were 694 households, out of which 21.3% had children under the age of 18 living with them, 32.1% were married couples living together, 15.4% had a female householder with no husband present, and 48.0% were non-families. 32.3% of all households were made up of individuals, and 13.1% had someone living alone who was 65 years of age or older. The average household size was 2.42 and the average family size was 3.21.

In the city, the population was spread out, with 9.1% under the age of 18, 68.2% from 18 to 24, 10.3% from 25 to 44, 6.5% from 45 to 64, and 5.9% who were 65 years of age or older. The median age was 21 years. For every 100 females, there were 88.4 males. For every 100 females age 18 and over, there were 87.9 males.

The median income for a household in the city was $24,805, and the median income for a family was $36,071. Males had a median income of $25,882 versus $21,161 for females. The per capita income for the city was $8,219. About 13.2% of families and 24.4% of the population were below the poverty line, including 18.2% of those under age 18 and 14.9% of those age 65 or over.

Government and infrastructure
The City of Prairie View was established in 1969 with the motto: "Productive, United, Indomitable."  The city is operated by a mayor-council government of the strong-mayor format.  The format functions with the Mayor serving as both Chair of the City Council and Chief Executive of the city's administration.

At present the city's mayor is David Allen. The city practices zoning to control land use and improve quality of life.  The city has hired Butler Planning Services (BPS) to develop a Geographic Information System (GIS) which will aid the city staff in mapping the community.  The city is also considering a partnership with BPS and another planning firm, IPS Group, to develop a new Comprehensive Plan.

County, state, and federal representation
The United States Postal Service Prairie View Post Office is located at 21212 Farm to Market Road 1098 Loop.

Education

Colleges and universities

Prairie View is home to Prairie View A&M University. The university was established in 1876 as a historically black college under the Morill Land-Grant Acts, making it the first public institution of higher learning in Texas to educate African-Americans. Prairie View A&M grants both graduate and undergraduate degrees in more than 50 majors and is classified as a  Doctoral/Research University by the Carnegie Foundation. As of fall 2022, Prairie View A&M is the largest HBCU in the state and one of the largest in the country with nearly 9,500 students, approximately 83% Black/African-American.

Primary and secondary schools
The City of Prairie View is served by the Waller Independent School District.

Schools serving Prairie View include:
 Waller High School (Unincorporated Harris County)
 Waller Junior High School (Waller)
 Wayne C. Schultz Middle School (Unincorporated Harris County)
 Herman T. Jones Elementary School (Prairie View)

Transportation
Greyhound Bus Lines serves the Prairie View Station at Unco Food Store.

Parks and recreation
In September 2018 a cricket complex in Prairie View was scheduled to open. It was established by Pakistani American Tanweer Ahmed.

Sister cities
Prairie View's sister cities are:
 Aseseeso, Ghana
 Guachené, Colombia
 Manta, Colombia
 Pabellón de Arteaga, Mexico
 Punta Gorda, Belize

References

External links

 City of Prairie View official website 
 Prairie View A&M University's official website 
 KPVU Radio official website
 Handbook of Texas Online

Cities in Waller County, Texas
Cities in Texas
Greater Houston